Enrique M. Jurado (born October 12, 1976, in Lima, Peru) is a Thoroughbred racehorse jockey in the United States. He rode for three years at Monterrico Racecourse in the Lima suburb of Santiago de Surco before emulating his countryman Edgar Prado and emigrated to the U.S. in 1994 where he began riding at racetracks in Florida.

Among his better known hoses, Jurado rode the talented gelding, Sir Bear.  Enrique Jurado won 802 races from 6,266 starts in North American thoroughbred races.  Additionally, Jurado won 256 races in his native Peru prior to his arrival in the United States in 1994.

References

1976 births
Living people
Peruvian jockeys
American jockeys
Sportspeople from Lima
Peruvian emigrants to the United States